The Boston mayoral election of 1884 saw the election of Hugh O'Brien, who unseated incumbent mayor Augustus Pearl Martin.

Results

See also
List of mayors of Boston, Massachusetts

References

Mayoral elections in Boston
Boston
Boston mayoral
19th century in Boston